Richard C. Harding is an American retired lieutenant general who served as the Judge Advocate General of the United States Air Force.  By federal statute, he served as the legal adviser to the Secretary of the Air Force, the Air Force Chief of Staff, and all officers subordinate to them.

Biography

In 2010, Harding was promoted to lieutenant general (skipping the rank of major general) and became the Judge Advocate General of the United States Air Force.

References

Year of birth missing (living people)
Living people
American military lawyers
United States Air Force generals
Judge Advocates General of the United States Air Force
University of Arkansas alumni
University of Arkansas School of Law alumni